Marcelo is a given name, the Spanish and Portuguese form of Marcellus. The Italian version of the name is Marcello, differing in having an additional "l". Marcelo may refer to:

Marcelo Costa de Andrade (born 1967), Brazilian serial killer, rapist, and necrophile
Marcelinho Carioca (Marcelo Pereira Surcin born 1971 in RJ), Brazilian international midfielder in 1990s
Marcelinho Machado (born 1975), Brazilian professional basketball player
Marcelinho Paraíba (Marcelo dos Santos b. 1975 in Paraíba state), Brazilian international midfielder
Marcelinho Paulista (Marcelo José de Souza born 1973 in SP state), Brazilian youth international in 1996 Olympics
Marcelo (footballer, born January 1987), Brazilian footballer
Marcelo (footballer, born May 1987), Brazilian footballer, who played for Lyon
Marcelo (footballer, born 1988), Brazilian footballer, who played for Real Madrid
Marcelo (footballer, born 1989), Brazilian footballer, who plays for Paços Ferreira
Marcelo Arriagada (born 1973), Chilean road cyclist
Marcelo Barovero (born 1984), Argentine football goalkeeper 
Marcelo Barticciotto (born 1967), Argentine-born Chilean former footballer and manager
Marcelo Bordon (born 1976), Brazilian footballer
Marcelo Cabo (born 1966), Brazilian football manager
Marcello Caetano (1906–1980), Portuguese politician
Marcelo Carrusca (born 1983), Argentine-Australian professional footballer
Marcelo Cassaro (born 1970), Brazilian author of comics
Marcelo Chamusca (born 1966)
Marcelo Chierighini (born 1991), Brazilian competitive swimmer
Marcelo Cirino (born 1992), Brazilian footballer
Marcelinho (footballer, born 1978) (born 1978 in Paraná state), Brazilian footballer
Marcelo Del Debbio (born 1974), Brazilian architect and writer
Marcelo Demoliner (born 1989), Brazilian tennis player
Cello Dias, bass guitarist for American alternative rock band Against All Will
Marcelo Díaz
Marcelo Djian (born 1966), Brazilian  footballer of Armenian descent
Marcelo (footballer, born 1969), a Brazilian striker most famous for his time at Birmingham City
Marcelo Fromer (1961–2001), guitarist of Brazilian rock band Titãs
Marcelo Garraffo (born 1957), retired field hockey player from Argentina
Marcelinho (footballer, born 1990) (born 1990), Brazilian striker
Marcelo Aguiar Quarterole (born 1978 RJ state), striker
Marcelinho (footballer, born 1994) (AKA Marcelinho, born 1994), Brazilian footballer
Marcelo José da Silva (born 1976), known as Marcelo Silva - Brazilian former footballer
Marcelo Lipatín (born 1977), Uruguayan football (soccer) player
Marcelo Melo (born 1983), Brazilian tennis player
Marcelinho (footballer, born August 1984), Brazilian-born Bulgarian footballer
Marcelo Negrão (born 1972), volleyball player from Brazil
Marcelinho (footballer, born September 1984) (born 1984), Brazilian striker with A. Naval 1º de Maio
Marcelo Ramos (footballer, born 1973), Brazilian former soccer player as a striker
Marcelo Rebelo de Sousa (born 1946), current President of Portugal
Marcelo Ríos (born 1975), former World No. 1 tennis player from Chile
Marcelinho (footballer, born January 1987), Brazilian striker
Marcelinho (footballer, born 1981), Brazilian midfielder for Botafogo
Marcelo Signorelli (born 1963), Italian-Uruguayan professional basketball coach, book author and former player
Marčelo (born 1983), Serbian hip-hop artist
Marcelinho (footballer, born June 1987), Brazilian footballer playing for Indian Super League club Hyderabad

See also

 

Spanish masculine given names
Portuguese masculine given names

zh:马塞洛